SMS Baden was one of four  armored frigates of the German Imperial Navy. Baden was built in the Imperial Dockyard in Kiel from 1876 to 1883. The ship was commissioned into the Imperial Navy in September 1883. She was armed with a main battery of six  guns in two open barbettes.

After her commissioning, Baden served with the fleet on numerous training exercises and cruises in the 1880s and 1890s, during which she frequently simulated hostile naval forces. She participated in several cruises escorting Kaiser Wilhelm II on state visits to Great Britain and to various countries in the Baltic Sea in the late 1880s and early 1890s. During 1896–1897, the ship was extensively rebuilt at the Germaniawerft dockyard in Kiel. She was removed from active duty in 1910 and thereafter served in a number of secondary roles, finally serving as a target hulk in the 1920s and 1930s. She was sold in April 1938 and broken up in 1939–1940 in Kiel.

Design 

The Sachsen class was the first group of capital ships built under the tenure of General Albrecht von Stosch, the first Chief of the Imperial Admiralty. Stosch favored a coastal defense strategy for the German fleet, and the Sachsens were intended to operate from fortified ports, from which they could sortie to attack blockading fleets. They proved to be controversial in service, as critics pointed out their poor seakeeping, tendency to roll in heavy seas, and low speed compared to earlier armored frigates.

Baden was powered by two 3-cylinder single-expansion steam engines, which were supplied with steam by eight coal-fired Dürr boilers. The boilers were vented into four funnels in an unusual square arrangement. Her standard complement consisted of 32 officers and 285 enlisted men, though while serving as a squadron flagship this was augmented by another 7 officers and 34 men.

She was armed with a main battery of six  guns, two of which were single-mounted in an open barbette forward of the conning tower and the remaining four mounted amidships, also on single mounts in an open barbette. As built, the ship was also equipped with six  L/24 guns and eight  Hotchkiss revolver cannons for defense against torpedo boats. 

Badens armor was made of wrought iron, and was concentrated in an armored citadel amidships. The barbette armor was 254 mm of wrought iron backed by 250 mm of teak.

Service history 

Baden was ordered by the Imperial Navy under the contract name "C," which denoted that the vessel was a new addition to the fleet. She was built at the Imperial Dockyard in Kiel; her keel was laid down in 1876 under yard number 4. The ship was launched on 28 July 1880 and was commissioned into the German fleet on 24 September 1883. Along with her three sisters, Baden was the first large, armored warship built for the German navy that relied entirely on engines for propulsion. Following her commissioning, Baden joined the fleet too late to participate in the fleet maneuvers that year. Baden served as the flagship for Rear Admiral Alexander von Monts during the 1884 fleet maneuvers; she was assigned to I Division alongside her three sisters. The ship was placed in reserve in 1885, but returned to active duty the following year for training exercises with the fleet. In June 1887, Germany dedicated the Kaiser Wilhelm Canal; Baden was among the ships present during the celebrations.

In 1888, Baden returned to active duty to take part in a naval tour of the Baltic by the newly crowned Kaiser Wilhelm II. Rear Admiral Eduard Knorr, the commander of the fleet, raised his flag aboard Baden during the voyage. The fleet stopped in St. Petersburg, Stockholm, and Copenhagen on the seventeen-day cruise. Baden ran aground in the harbors of both Stockholm and Copenhagen, but was not seriously damaged in either incident. Baden also participated in the visit to Great Britain in August 1889, where Wilhelm II took part in the Cowes Regatta. Baden and the rest of the fleet joined the Royal Navy in a fleet review for Queen Victoria.

During the fleet maneuvers of 1890, Baden and the rest of the capital ships of I and II Divisions simulated a Russian attack on Kiel. The exercises were held in conjunction with IX Corps of the German Army, several divisions of which acted as a simulated amphibious invasion. Baden remained in I Division in 1891, when she was joined by the new coastal defense ship . During the 1891 maneuvers, I Division generally "fought" on the German side, against either Franco-Russian or Danish-Russian alliances. Baden was present for all of the fleet exercises in 1892 and 1893. The maneuvers of the early 1890s were generally disappointments, as the "hostile" forces were judged to be the victors in the majority of the scenarios.

By the winter of 1894–1895, the last of the four s had been commissioned; these ships were assigned to I Division, which displaced Baden and her three sisters to II Division. The eight ships conducted training cruises over the winter and spring before conducting the annual autumn fleet exercises. On 21 June 1895, the Kaiser Wilhelm Canal was opened for traffic, eight years after work had begun. Baden and her three sisters, along with dozens of other warships, attended the ceremonies. The major naval powers sent fleets to join the fleet review. The Autumn 1895 maneuvers simulated a high-seas battle between I and II Divisions in the North Sea, followed by combined maneuvers with the rest of the fleet in the Baltic.

In 1896, Baden went into drydock in the Germaniawerft dockyard in Kiel for an extensive modernization. The ship's old wrought iron and teak armor was replaced with new Krupp nickel-steel armor. The ship's 8.7 cm guns were replaced with quick-firing  SK L/30 guns and four  autocannons. Work was completed in 1897. Baden remained with the fleet until 1910, at which point she was removed from active duty. She then served as a blockade and defense hulk after 1912. In 1920, she was converted into a target hulk and stationed off Stollergrund. The ship was finally sold on 23 April 1938 and broken up for scrap in 1939–1940 in Kiel.

Footnotes

Notes

Citations

References 

 
 
 
 
 

Sachsen-class ironclads
1880 ships
Ships built in Stettin